The Voice on the Wire is a 1917 American action film serial directed by Stuart Paton. It is presumed to be lost.

Cast

 Ben F. Wilson as John Shirley (as Ben Wilson)
 Neva Gerber as Polly Marion
 Joseph W. Girard as Dr. Reynolds
 Francis McDonald as Red Warren
 Kingsley Benedict
 William Canfield as William Grimsby
 Nigel De Brulier
 Howard Crampton
 L. M. Wells
 Frank MacQuarrie
 Frank Tokunaga
 Ernest Shields
 Hoot Gibson
 Josephine Hill

Chapter titles
 The Oriental Death Punch
 The Mysterious Man
 The Spider's Web
 The Next Victim
 The Spectral Hand
 The Death Warrant
 The Marked Room
 High Finance
 A Stern Chase
 The Guarded Heart
 The Thought Machine
 The Sign of The Thumb
 Twixt Death and Dawn
 The Light Dawn
 The Living Death

See also
 Hoot Gibson filmography
List of lost films

References

External links

1917 films
1917 lost films
1910s action films
American silent serial films
American black-and-white films
American action films
Films directed by Stuart Paton
Lost American films
Lost action films
Universal Pictures film serials
1910s American films
Silent action films